The Eastern Collegiate Football Conference (ECFC) was an intercollegiate athletic conference that existed from 1988 to 1997 and one of two college football conferences to share this name. The league had members in the states of Massachusetts and Rhode Island.

Champions
 1989 – 
 1990 – 
 1991 – 
 1992 – 
 1993 – 
 1994 – 
 1995 – 
 1996 – 
 1997 –

See also
List of defunct college football conferences

References

 
College sports in Massachusetts
College sports in Rhode Island